Sodium trifluoroacetate is a chemical compound with a formula of CF3CO2Na. It is the sodium salt of trifluoroacetic acid. It is used as a source of trifluoromethylations.

Basicity 
With a pKa of 0.23 for trifluoroacetic acid, the trifluoroacetate ion is an extremely weak base compared to acetic acid, which has a pKa of 4.76. This is due to the electron-withdrawing effect of the three fluorine atoms adjacent the carboxylate group.  Strong acids such as hydrochloric acid or sulfuric acid can protonate the trifluoroacetate ion to trifluoroacetic acid:

CF3CO2- + HCl -> CF3CO2H + Cl-

CF3CO2- + H2SO4 -> CF3CO2H + HSO4-

In general, trifluoroacetate reacts in equilibrium with hydronium cations to form trifluoroacetic acid:

CF3CO2- + H3O+ <=>> CF3CO2H + H2O

The general reaction with hydronium is in equilibrium due to the similarity in pKa between trifluoroacetic acid and the hydronium ion.

Preparation 
One convenient method is by dissolving an equivalent amount of sodium carbonate in 50% aqueous solution of trifluoroacetic acid. The solution is filtered and evaporated by vacuum evaporation (with special care to avoid decomposition of the salt by overheating). The solid obtained is dried under vacuum at 100 °C.

Uses 
Sodium trifluoroacetate is a useful reagent for trifluoromethylation.

See also 

 Sodium fluoroacetate
 Trifluoroacetic acid
 Sodium acetate

References 

Organic sodium salts
Trifluoroacetates